Howling is Hitomi Yaida's debut single under the name of Hitomi Yaida. It was released independently by Aozora Records on May 3, 2000.

Although only available in the Kansai region of Japan, the single reached number 50 on the Oricon charts. As a result of its popularity, Yaida was subsequently offered a recording contract with Toshiba-EMI.

This was Aozora's first ever release as the label itself was established the same day as the single was released. Aozora benefited from the attention this single attracted, also selling distribution contracts to Toshiba-EMI for its future catalogue.

Track listing

Personnel
Hitomi Yaida - Music and Writing
Diamond Head - Backing and Production
Takashi Saito - Electric Bass on "How?" and "I Like", Electric Bass and Percussion on "I Like" and Wood Bass on "We'll Be..."

Notes and references

External links
 Howling (Single) chart history oricon.co.jp

Hitomi Yaida songs
2000 debut singles
Songs written by Hitomi Yaida
2000 songs